Transport for London Corporate Archives, formerly Transport for London Group Archives, is the official historical business archive for Transport for London (TfL) and its predecessor bodies.  It preserves and makes available to the public documents, photographs, plans and drawings relating to the company and its predecessor bodies, such as London Transport.  It is based at Endeavour Square, Stratford.

History 

London Transport did not appoint an archivist until 1992, by which time a significant volume of records had accumulated in the vaults under the organisation's former headquarters at 55 Broadway since the opening of the first Victorian underground lines in the 1860s.  With the formation of TfL in 2000, the corporate archives became the responsibility of TfL Corporate Archives and Records Management department.

Material held 

The majority of TfL Corporate Archives holdings are records of:
 London Transport (in its various incarnations from 1933–2000)
 Transport for London (2000–present day)

TfL Corporate Archives also holds records from a large number of predecessor bodies, including: 
 The London General Omnibus Company
 London County Council Tramways
 London United Tramways
 The Metropolitan Railway
 The District Railway
 The Central London Railway
 The City and South London Railway
 The Great Northern and City Railway
 The Hammersmith and City Railway
 The Underground Electric Railways Company of London

Some of the records of predecessor companies, such as the Metropolitan Railway and early minutes from the London Passenger Transport Board, are held on behalf of TfL by the London Metropolitan Archives.

Storage and access 

Documents are stored offsite in the worked-out parts of Winsford Rock Salt Mine, Winsford, Cheshire, Britain's largest rock salt mine. The storage facility is operated by DeepStore Ltd., a records' management company. Access to the archives is restricted and is by advance appointment only.  TfL Corporate Archives catalogue of all records held are available online and searchable by the public.

References

External links 
 Transport for London Corporate Archives
 London Metropolitan Archives
 London Transport Museum
 DeepStore

Archives in Cheshire
Archives in the London Borough of Islington
Transport for London
History of transport in London